Edward Luke Butka (January 7, 1916 – April 21, 2005), nicknamed "Babe", was a  Major League Baseball first baseman who played for the Washington Senators in  and .

External links

1916 births
2005 deaths
Washington Senators (1901–1960) players
Major League Baseball first basemen
Baseball players from Pennsylvania
People from Canonsburg, Pennsylvania
Newport Canners players